Louis Carl Heuschkel (1901-1988) was an Australian rugby league footballer who played in the 1920s.

Born at Balmain in 1901, Heuschkel was a pioneer player with the St George club during the club's earliest years in the NSWRFL (1921 and 1922).

Mainly a reserve grade player, Heuschkel played only four first grade games during his two-year career at the club before retiring.

Death

Heuschkel died at Kogarah Bay, New South Wales on 5 July 1988, aged 87.

References

1901 births
1988 deaths
St. George Dragons players
Rugby league wingers
Rugby league players from Sydney